The Bouli River is a river of Benin. A tributary of the Sota River, its headwaters are located north of Ina in Borgou Department and the river flows northeast, meeting the Sota near Bensékou in Alibori Department.

References

Rivers of Benin